Frederick Craufurd Goodenough (28 July 18661 September 1934), was a British banker. He was the chairman of Barclays Bank from 1917 to 1934.

Early life
Frederick Craufurd Goodenough was born in Calcutta, India in 1866 as Frederick Crawford Goodenough. He was the son of an East India Company merchant Frederick Addington Goodenough and Mary Lambert. He was the grandson of Edmund Goodenough, Dean of Wells from 1831 to 1845. He was educated at the Charterhouse School and Zurich University.

Career
Goodenough was the chairman of Barclays Bank from 1917 to 1934.

Death and legacy
Goodenough died in London in 1934. He was a founder of Goodenough College. His son, Sir William Goodenough, 1st Baronet (1899-1951) was chairman of Barclays Bank from 1947 to 1951.

References

External links
 

1866 births
1934 deaths
Barclays people
British chairpersons of corporations
Chairmen of Barclays
Frederick
People educated at Charterhouse School
Zurich University of the Arts alumni